Huwara or Howwarah is a Palestinian town located in the Nablus Governorate of the State of Palestine, in the northern West Bank,  south of Nablus, on the main road connecting Nablus southwards to Ramallah and Jerusalem. According to the Palestinian Central Bureau of Statistics, the town had a population of 5,800 in 2006.

Location
It is bordered by Awarta, Odala and Beita to the east, Za'tara and Yasuf to the south, Jamma'in and Einabus to the west, and Asira al-Qibliya and Burin to the north.

History
Huwara is an ancient site, and cisterns and rock-cut tombs have been found, together with remains of columns. It has been suggested that Huwara should be identified with Horon, hometown of Sanballat the Horonite.

In the 12th and 13th centuries, Huwara was inhabited by Muslims. Finkelstein did not find any potsherds predating the Ottoman era.

Ottoman period (1516–1917) 
The village was incorporated into the Ottoman Empire in 1517 with all of Palestine, and in 1596 it appeared in the tax registers as being in the Nahiya of Jabal Qubal, part of Nablus Sanjak.  It had a population of 87 households, all Muslim. The villagers paid a fixed tax rate of 33.3% on various products, such as wheat, barley, summer crops, olives, goats and/or beehives, and a press for olives or grapes, in addition to "occasional revenues"; a total of  14,000 akçe.

In 1838, Robinson described Huwara as a "large and old village". It was also noted as a Muslim village, in Jurat Merda, south of Nablus.

In the 1850s the Ottoman rulers withdrew their soldiers from the district (to be used in the Crimean War), and hence open hostility could ensue between different Palestinian factions. In 1853, Huwara was engaged in a battle with the neighboring villages of Quza and Beita which left ten men and seven women dead.

Victor Guérin visited the village in 1870. He found the village, (which he called Haouarah), to have about 800 inhabitants, and that it was divided into two districts, each administered by a sheikh. A oualy was dedicated to Abou en-Nebyh Sahin.

In 1882, the PEF's Survey of Western Palestine described Huwarah as a village "of stone and mud at the foot of Gerizim, just over the main road. It has an appearance of antiquity, and covers a considerable extent of ground".

British Mandate period
In the 1922 census of Palestine conducted by the British Mandate authorities, Huwara had a population of 921, all Muslims, increasing slightly in the 1931 census, where Huwara (together with the smaller location Bir Quza) had 240 occupied houses and a population of 955, still all Muslims.

In the 1945 statistics Huwwara had a population of 1,300, all Muslims,  with 7,982 dunams of land, according to an official land and population survey. Of this, 607 dunams were plantations and irrigable land, 4,858 used for cereals, while 129 dunams were built-up (urban) land.

The first elementary school was established in 1947. Huwara Elementary as well as secondary schools serves infants from neighboring villages up to the present time.

Jordanian era

In the wake of the 1948 Arab–Israeli War, and after the 1949 Armistice Agreements, Huwara came under Jordanian rule. The first elementary school  was converted into secondary school in 1962. The first female elementary school was established in 1957.

The Jordanian census of 1961 found 1,966 inhabitants.

Post-1967
Since the 1967 Six-Day War, Huwara has been under Israeli occupation.

After the 1995 accords, 38% of  Huwwara land was classified as Area B, the remaining 62% as Area C. Israel has confiscated 282 dunams of Huwwara land for the Israeli settlement of Yitzhar.

Huwara has been the target of price tag attacks, random acts of violence by Israeli Jewish settlers. According to the International Middle East Media Center (IMEMC), in April 2010 settlers torched three Palestinian vehicles in Huwara,  while on 27 February 2011, in a price-tag attack against the evacuation of Havat Gilad, settlers threw molotov cocktails at a house in the village. In March 2012 a Star of David was sprayed on a village mosque. In March 2013, hours after the Tapuah Junction stabbing, Jewish settlers descended on Huwara in another price-tag attack. They attacked a bus carrying Palestinian schoolgirls with stones, shattering a wind-shield and wounding the driver.

In October 2014, during the olive harvest season, a fire razed to the ground huge swathes of Palestinian-owned agricultural land between the village of Huwara, near Nablus and the Yitzhar settlement in the West Bank, destroying over a hundred olive trees. Although the cause of the fire has been contested, the mayor of Huwara claimed masked men from nearby Yitzhar and surrounding settlements set the fire by pouring incendiary fluids on the trees and that the Israeli occupation forces prevented Palestinian citizens from reaching the lands in order to extinguish the fire. Later on, the Israeli forces allowed the civil defence from the adjacent Palestinian village of Burin to extinguish the fire, but only after it had expanded to an even larger area . The burning and damaging of olive trees is an ongoing-concern of the United Nations, a pattern the New York Times call "price tag" attacks. The United Nations has reported that by 2013 "...Israeli settlers damaged or destroyed nearly 11,000 olive trees owned by the Palestinians in the occupied West Bank."

North of Huwara, was the Huwwara Checkpoint, one of the Israeli checkpoints around Nablus, dismantled in 2011 in order to ease traffic between Nablus and Ramallah.

Its location on the main road, used by both Israelis from four Israeli settlements in the Nablus area and Palestinians from the Nablus area, is a controlling factor of the life in Huwara. The town has many businesses located on the road, which is controlled by the Israeli army to ensure free passage to Jews and Arabs.

2023

2023 Huwara shooting

On 26 February 2023, a Palestinian gunman shot and killed two young Israeli settlers who were yeshiva students and brothers age 19, and 20, Yagel and Hillel Yaniv in a terror attack. The brothers were killed in their car driving through Huwara.

2023 Huwara rampage

Soon after, Huwara was attacked by hundreds of Israeli settlers who torched 30 homes and cars (some sources say "200 buildings" across "four Palestinian villages"), and killed one Palestinian, in what international media sources characterized as an "unprecedented settler rampage".

Witnesses and video evidence indicated that Israeli soldiers watched, but did not act to halt the violence. The Israeli army was criticized for not intervening, despite expecting the violence. But Israel's West Bank commander, Maj. Gen. Yehuda Fuchs, said the army was unprepared for the severity of the Huwara attack, calling it  “a pogrom done by outlaws” -- a term historically applied to mob attacks against eastern European Jews in the 1800s and early 1900s.

Following the attack, Israel's new far-right Finance Minister, Bezalel Smotrich -- now with new authority over the West Bank --  stated “I think the village of Huwara needs to be wiped out. I think the State of Israel should do it.” The remark triggered international condemnation from the U.N. Secretary General, the United States State Department (which called for Israeli Prime Minister Benjamin Netanyahu to renounce it), Jordan, the United Arab Emirates and others. The remark came before a scheduled major fund-raising visit by Smotrich to the United States, and multiple Jewish rights organizations called for the State Department to deny him entry.

2023 Huwara attack on US Marine

On March 19 2023, an US Marine veteran, American-Israeli settler and American citizen in his 30s, David Stern, was seriously injured in an attack after being shot at close range several times with a semiautomatic weapon by a Palestinian gunman while driving through Huwara with his wife and 3 small children, who were all American citizens. The US Marine veteran sustained gunshot wounds to his head and shoulder in the attack on the Route 60 highway. He was taken to the Beilinson Hospital in Petah Tikvah, where his condition was later upgraded to serious. Stern’s wife, also an American citizen, was also taken to a hospital suffering from traumatic shock. She was not shot by the Palestinian gunman. The Palestinian gunman was identified as Laith Nadim Nassar, a resident of the village of Madama, southwest of Nablus, fled the scene and was apprehended by Israeli authorities and was taken by military medics for treatment at a hospital, before he was to be handed over to the Shin Bet for questioning.

Palestinians throughout the West Bank celebrated the shooting attack, cheering and handing out sweets.
Hamas also praised the terror attack, with spokesperson Hazem Qassem saying it was "a natural response to the crimes of the occupation against the Palestinian people."
He further stated that "the resistance in the West Bank is getting stronger... and no security meeting in Aqaba or Sharm el-Sheikh can stop it." Palestinian Islamic Jihad also welcomed the attack, calling it "a natural response to the crimes of the occupation in Damascus in Jenin," American Ambassador to Israel Tom Nides responded to the terror attack on Twitter, "I can confirm that a US citizen was injured in the shooting attack near Huwara today. Prayers for a speedy recovery and for calm to prevail."

References

Bibliography

 

    
  
 

 
   
 
 
   
  

 

 (Saulcy, 1854, vol 1, p. 102)

External links
Welcome To Huwwara
 Huwara, Welcome to Palestine
Survey of Western Palestine, Map 14: IAA, Wikimedia commons 
Howwarah Municipality 
Huwwara Town Profile, Applied Research Institute–Jerusalem (ARIJ)
Huwwara, aerial photo, ARIJ

Towns in the West Bank
Nablus Governorate
Municipalities of the State of Palestine